Events from the year 2004 in the United States.

Incumbents

Federal government 
 President: George W. Bush (R-Texas)
 Vice President: Dick Cheney (R-Wyoming)
 Chief Justice: William Rehnquist (Wisconsin)
 Speaker of the House of Representatives: Dennis Hastert (R-Illinois)
 Senate Majority Leader: Bill Frist (R-Tennessee)
 Congress: 108th

Events

January 

 January 4 – NASA's MER-A (Spirit) lands on Mars at 04:35 UTC.
 January 19
 U.S. Senator John Kerry (D-MA) wins the Iowa Democratic caucus. Former Vermont Governor Howard Dean's concession speech ends with a lively but controversial scream.
 British children's television series Boohbah (made by Ragdoll Productions who also made Teletubbies) begins its first ever television premiere in the U.S. on PBS KIDS.
 January 20 – State of the Union Address.
 January 24 – NASA's MER-B (Opportunity) lands on Mars at 05:05 UTC.
 January 28 – At a hearing of the National Commission on Terrorist Attacks Upon the United States, it is revealed that the September 11, 2001, terrorists used Mace (a brand of tear gas) or pepper spray in overpowering the flight crew of American Airlines Flight 11.

February 
 February 1 – The New England Patriots win Super Bowl XXXVIII. The halftime show becomes one of the most controversial events in television history, as Janet Jackson's breast is exposed to an audience of 143.6 million viewers.
 February 3 – The CIA admits that there was no imminent threat from weapons of mass destruction before the 2003 invasion of Iraq.
 February 4 – The social network Facebook launches.
 February 12 – Same sex marriage in the United States: The City and County of San Francisco begins issuing marriage licenses to same-sex couples as an act of civil disobedience.
 February 14 – Jetix is introduced on Toon Disney and ABC Family, making it the first trade-name to be introduced as an anime-based block.
 February 26 – The United States lifts a ban on travel to Libya, ending travel restrictions to the nation that had lasted for 23 years.
 February 29 – The 76th Academy Awards, hosted by Billy Crystal, are held at the Kodak Theatre in Hollywood, California, with Peter Jackson's The Lord of the Rings: The Return of the King winning a record-tying 11 Oscars (tied with 1959's Ben-Hur and 1997's Titanic), including Best Picture and Best Director. The film also breaks the record tied by 1958's Gigi and 1987's The Last Emperor for the largest sweep for a single film in Oscar history. The telecast garners nearly 43.6 million viewers, making it the most-watched broadcast since 2000.

March 
 March 2
 NASA announces that the Mars rover MER-B (Opportunity) has confirmed that its landing area was once drenched in water.
 John Kerry effectively clinches the 2004 Democratic Party presidential nomination by winning nine out of 10 "Super Tuesday" primaries and caucuses.
 March 12 – Marcus Wesson is arrested in Fresno, California after killing nine family members. Wesson had built a cult around his family and had molested and "married" several of his daughters. He was sentenced to death in 2005.
 March 31 – Four American private military contractors working for Blackwater USA are killed and their bodies mutilated after being ambushed in Fallujah, Iraq.

April 

 April 2 – Walt Disney Pictures' 45th feature film, Home on the Range, is released to mixed reviews and middling box office numbers. It is the studio's last traditionally-animated film until 2009's The Princess and the Frog (not counting the animation in the 2007 movie Enchanted.
 April 22 – Pat Tillman, a former NFL player who enlisted in the US Army, is killed by friendly fire in eastern Afghanistan. The U.S. military does not reveal this to the public until weeks later, after initially saying he was killed by enemy combatants.
 April 28 – Abu Ghraib prisoner abuse is revealed on the television show 60 Minutes II.
 April 29 – The last Oldsmobile rolls off of the assembly line.

May 
 May – Emergence of cicada Brood X (Brood 10) begins in the eastern United States.
 May 4 – A WNBC helicopter crashes in the Flatbush neighborhood of Brooklyn, New York. This event is covered by rival station WABC-TV.
 May 6 – The final episode of Friends airs on NBC, drawing an estimated 66 million viewers in North America. Advertisers pay $2 million for 30 second ads.
 May 8 – Would-be "Saudi Princess" Antoinette Millard surfaces in New York City, claiming that muggers had stolen jewels worth of $262,000 from her (she later proves to be an impostor).
 May 12 – An American civilian contractor in Iraq, Nick Berg, is shown being decapitated by a group allegedly linked to al-Qaeda on an Internet-distributed video. They state it is retaliation for the abuse at Abu Ghraib prison.
 May 13 – The final episode of Frasier airs on NBC. The episode was viewed by 33.7 million people, being the 11th most-watched series finale and the 7th most watched from NBC.
 May 14 – Lynn Turner is convicted of the 1995 murder of her husband Glenn Turner by poisoning him with anti-freeze. She is also accused of the murder of her second husband, Randy Thompson.
 May 17 – Massachusetts legalizes same-sex marriage in compliance with a ruling from the state's Supreme Court ruling in the case of Goodridge v. Department of Public Health.
 May 26 
 Fantasia Barrino wins season 3 of American Idol
 Terry Nichols is convicted by an Oklahoma state court on murder charges stemming from the 1995 Oklahoma City bombing.
 May 29 – Dedication of the National World War II Memorial takes place in Washington, DC.

June 

 June 3 – Director of Central Intelligence George Tenet tenders his resignation, citing "personal reasons". John E. McLaughlin, CIA Deputy Director, becomes the acting director until a permanent director is chosen and confirmed by Congress.
 June 4 – Marvin Heemeyer destroys many local buildings with a home-made tank in Granby, Colorado.
 June 5 – Ronald Reagan, the 40th President of the United States, dies at his home in Bel-Air, California, at the age of 93. A six-day state funeral follows after his death.
 June 8-9 – The G8 Summit takes place on Sea Island, in Georgia, United States.
 June 11
 The national funeral service for Ronald Reagan is held at the National Cathedral in Washington, D.C.
 Terry Nichols is spared the death penalty by an Oklahoma state court on murder charges stemming from the 1995 Oklahoma City bombing, exactly three years after his co-defendant, Timothy McVeigh, was executed for his role in the bombing.
 June 16 – The National Commission on Terrorist Attacks Upon the United States (or "9/11 Commission") issues an initial report of its findings.
 June 21 – In Mojave, California, SpaceShipOne becomes the first privately funded spaceplane to achieve spaceflight.
 June 28
 The U.S.-led coalition occupying Iraq transfers sovereignty to an interim Iraqi government.
 Union Pacific and Burlington Northern Santa Fe trains collide in a rural area outside of San Antonio, Texas; 40 cars are derailed, including one chlorine car. Three people die, another 50 people are hospitalized because of exposure to the gas.
 June 30 – Spider-Man 2 is released in theaters.

July 

 July 4 – A symbolic cornerstone is laid for the re-construction of One World Trade Center in New York City.
 July 25 – Lance Armstrong wins a record 6th consecutive Tour de France cycling title.
 July 26-July 29 – The Democratic National Convention in Boston, Massachusetts nominates John Kerry for U.S. president and John Edwards for vice president. Future President Barack Obama delivers the keynote address.
 July 31 – "The Last Dispatch" concert is played as a reunion concert with the band Dispatch on the Hatch Shell in Boston; 110,000 people attend, making it the single largest gathering in independent music industry history.
 July – UFOetry rock band from Los Angeles is formed.

August 
 August 3
 The Statue of Liberty reopens after security improvements.
 NASA's MESSENGER is launched (it was captured into Mercury's orbit on March 18, 2011).
 August 12 – New Jersey Governor James McGreevey announces that he is "a gay American" and will resign effective November 15, 2004.
 August 13 – Hurricane Charley kills 27 people in Florida, after killing four in Cuba and one in Jamaica. Charley makes landfall near Cayo Costa, Florida as a Category 4 hurricane. Charley is the most intense hurricane to strike the United States since Hurricane Andrew in 1992.
 August 13–29 – The United States compete at the Summer Olympics in Athens, Greece, and win 36 gold, 39 silver, and 27 bronze medals.
 August 19 – Google becomes a publicly traded company via initial public offering.
 August 29 – Around 200,000 protesters demonstrate in New York City against President George W. Bush and his government, ahead of the Republican National Convention.
 August 30-September 2 – U.S. President George W. Bush and Vice President Dick Cheney are re-nominated at the Republican National Convention in New York City.
 August – Shadowville Productions business is founded in Brooklyn, New York.

September 
 September 3 – Hurricane Frances makes landfall in Florida. After killing two people in the Bahamas, Hurricane Frances kills 10 people in Florida, two in Georgia and one in South Carolina.
 September 4 – Thomas & Friends comes to PBS KIDS as a stand-alone program with Michael Brandon taking over as the narrator.
 September 8 – In the "Rathergate" affair, the first Internet posts appear pointing out that documents claimed by CBS News to be typewritten memos from the early 1970s appear instead to have been produced using modern word processing systems.
 September 13 – The U.S. Federal Assault Weapons Ban expires.
 September 16 – Hurricane Ivan strikes Gulf Shores, Alabama, as a Category 3 storm, killing 25 in Alabama and Florida, becoming the third-costliest hurricane in American history at the time.
 September 23
Tropical Storm Ivan, having come around and re-formed in the Gulf of Mexico, makes its final landfall near Cameron, Louisiana, to little effect. In total, the storm kills 92 people.
 Mount St. Helens becomes active again.
 September 24 – Major League Baseball announces that the Montreal Expos will move to Washington D.C. in 2005.
 September 25 – Hurricane Jeanne makes landfall near Port Saint Lucie, Florida, near the location Hurricane Frances hit two weeks earlier. Jeanne kills over 3,030, mostly in Haiti.
 September 28 – A redesigned $50 bill is released, containing many of the same security features as its recently released $20 counterpart.
 September 29 – In Mojave, California, the first Ansari X-Prize flight takes place of SpaceShipOne, which is competing with a number of spacecraft (including Canada's Da Vinci Project, claimed to be its closest rival) and goes on to win the prize on October 4.
 September 30 – First debate of the U.S. presidential election, 2004.

October 
 October 5 – Vice Presidential debate of the U.S. presidential election, 2004 between candidates Dick Cheney and John Edwards.
 October 8 – Second debate of the U.S. presidential election, 2004.
 October 11 – PBS Kids debuts a programming block targeted at children aged 6–10 entitled PBS Kids Go!, with new shows Maya & Miguel and an Arthur spinoff, Postcards from Buster, debuting on this day with Cyberchase and Arthur moving to PBS Kids Go! from PBS Kids.
 October 13 – Third debate of the U.S. presidential election, 2004.
 October 16 – The New York Yankees defeat the Boston Red Sox by a score of 19–8 in Game 3 of Major League Baseball's American League Championship Series. The game, which pushes the Yankees to a 3–0 series lead, sets a record for longest nine-inning major league game. The Red Sox, however, rally to win the series in seven games.
 October 18 – Jimmy Wales and Angela Beesley Starling founds Fandom, Inc.
 October 20 
Corporate Airlines Flight 5966 crashes in Missouri, killing 13 people and injuring two.
The Boston Red Sox defeat the New York Yankees in Game 7 of the ALCS to advance to the World Series after being down 3–0 in the series.
 October 25 – Martin Luther King Jr. and Coretta Scott King receive the Congressional Gold Medal.
 October 27 – The Boston Red Sox win the World Series for the first time since 1918, breaking the Curse of the Bambino.
 October 29 – A videotape of Osama bin Laden speaking airs on Arabic TV, in which he threatens terrorist attacks on the United States and taunts President George W. Bush over the September 11 terrorist attacks.

November 

 November 2
 The 2004 United States presidential election is held. The United States re-elects George W. Bush of the Republican Party to a second term as President of the United States, defeating John Kerry. 
 11 American states ban gay marriage.
 November 5 – Pixar Animation Studios' sixth feature film, The Incredibles, is released in theaters.
 November 7 – Second Battle of Fallujah: U.S. Forces launch a major assault on the Iraqi town of Fallujah, in an effort to rid the area of insurgents before the Iraqi elections in January.
 November 14 – United States Secretary of State Colin Powell submits his resignation. He is replaced by Condoleezza Rice after her confirmation by the United States Congress.
 November 16 – NASA's hypersonic Scramjet breaks a record by reaching a velocity of about 7,000 mph in an unmanned experimental flight. It obtains a speed of Mach 9.6, almost 10 times the speed of sound.
 November 19 
 Nickelodeon's The SpongeBob SquarePants Movie, based on the cartoon of the same name is released, earning $9,559,752 on its opening day, and then $85,417,988 on the weekend alone only behind National Treasure.
 The NBA's Indiana Pacers and Detroit Pistons engage in a brawl that involves fans and players after the game is called with 45.9 seconds left in the game. The incident gets (then) Pacer Ron Artest suspended for the remainder of the season.
 November 30
 John Green and Charlie Haddad, who were involved in the Pacers-Pistons brawl on November 19, are banned from attending Pistons home games for life.
 Ken Jennings loses to Nancy Zerg, ending his 74-game winning streak on Jeopardy!.

December 
 December 2 – Brian Williams replaces Tom Brokaw as weeknight anchor for NBC Nightly News.
 December 3 – The Colombian government extradites Gilberto Rodríguez Orejuela, one of the most powerful drug dealers in the world, arrested in 1995 and 2003, to the United States.
 December 6 – Terrorists attack the U.S. Consulate in Jeddah, Saudi Arabia, killing several people.
 December 8 
 The biggest Chinese PC producer Lenovo announces its plan to purchase IBM's global PC business, making it the world's third largest PC producer after Dell and Hewlett-Packard.
 Former Pantera guitarist "Dimebag" Darrell Abbott is murdered on stage by gunman Nathan Gale in Columbus, Ohio. Gale kills three others before being shot dead by police.
 December 16 – Twenty-three-year-old pregnant woman Bobbie Jo Stinnett is found murdered in her home in Skidmore, Missouri. Her unborn baby has been cut out of her womb and is missing.
 December 21 – Iraqi insurgents attack a U.S. military base in the city of Mosul, killing 22 people.
 December 23 – Second Battle of Fallujah: US-UK-Iraqi forces defeat the remaining Iraqi insurgents in Fallujah.
 December 26
 Thirty-five Americans are among the victims of the 2004 Indian Ocean tsunami in across the region of South and Southeast Asia. There were fatalities in 14 countries, including India, Sri Lanka, and Thailand.
 U.S. President George W. Bush issues a statement expressing his condolences to those who lost loved ones during the tsunami.
 December 29 – U.S. President George W. Bush speaks out publicly about the deaths caused by the 9.1 magnitude earthquake and tsunami in Indian Ocean and answers questions at the Prairie Chapel Ranch.
 December 31
 U.S. President George W. Bush announces his committing of $350 million to support relief efforts for the "disaster around the Indian Ocean".
 Simón Trinidad, high-profile FARC leader, is extradited to the United States.

Ongoing 
 War in Afghanistan (2001–2021)
 Iraq War (2003–2011)

Undated 
 Logik, an e-discovery company is founded.
 Milk and Bookies non-profit organization is founded.
 "55% of adult internet users have broadband at home or work."

Births

January 

 January 4 – Jayvin Van Deventer, soccer player
 January 7
 Cody Baker, soccer player
 Patrick Cayelli, soccer player
 Sofia Wylie, actress and dancer
 January 10 – Kaitlyn Maher, singer and actress
 January 13 – Jack Brunault, actor
 January 14 – Paul Ji, pianist
 January 15
 Evie Dolan, singer and actress
 Grace VanderWaal, singer and songwriter
 January 19 – Mathias Yohannes, soccer player
 January 21 – Ciaran Dalton, soccer player
 January 22
 Tyler Armstrong, mountain climber
 Leo Torres, soccer player
 January 25 – Rohan Chand, actor
 January 26
 Evy Leibfarth, slalom canoeist
 Robby Novak, media personality
 January 27 – Rohan Chand, actor
 January 28
 Emoni Bates, basketball player
 Dior Johnson, basketball player

February 
 February 1 – Ashley Gerasimovich, actress
 February 3 – Gia Pergolini, Paralympic swimmer
 February 8 – Max Andrews, soccer player
 February 10 – CJ Fodrey, soccer player
 February 12 – Lauren Lee, taekwondo practitioner
 February 13 – Yekeson Subah, soccer player
 February 14 – Austin Brummett, soccer player
 February 17 – Amari Bailey, basketball player
 February 18 – Kylie Rogers, actress
 February 25 – Britton Fischer, soccer player
 February 26 – The Hanselman sextuplets, notable multiple birth
 February 27 – Owen Walz, soccer player
 February 29 – Lydia Jacoby, swimmer

March 

 March 1 – Izabella Alvarez, actress
 March 3 – Chris Brady, soccer player
 March 4 – Efrain Morales, soccer player
 March 7 – Ciena Alipio, gymnast
 March 8 – Wyatt Borso, soccer player
 March 9 
 Armando Avila, soccer player
 John Cortez, soccer player

 March 12 – Audrey Shin, figure skater
 March 13
 Ozzie Cisneros, soccer player
 Coco Gauff, tennis player
 March 16 – Kenan Hot, soccer player
 March 20 – Christopher Jaime, soccer player
 March 21 – Forrest Wheeler, actor
 March 25 – Jenna Hutchins, long-distance runner
 March 27 – Quinn Sullivan, soccer player

April 
 April 6 – Victor Valdez, soccer player
 April 7 – Brandan Craig, soccer player
 April 15 – Christian Torres, soccer player
 April 26 – Kobi Henry, soccer player
 April 27 – Matt Brucker, soccer player
 April 28
 Noah Allen, soccer player
 Tony Leone, soccer player
 April 29 – Juan Calderón, soccer player

May 

 May 1 – Charli D'Amelio, social media personality
 May 2 – Anastasia Pagonis, Paralympic swimmer
 May 3 – Nare Avetian, soccer player
 May 5 – Olivia Greaves, gymnast
 May 13 – Oliver Bell, actor
 May 15 – Gabriel Slonina, soccer player
 May 16 – Salvador Ramos, mass murderer (d. 2022)
 May 17 – Victoria Lee, mixed martial artist (d. 2023)
 May 21 – Jeff Dewsnup, soccer player
 May 22 – Peyton Elizabeth Lee, actress
 May 27 – Allan Rodriguez, soccer player

June 

 June 1 – Ixhelt González, wheelchair basketball player
 June 4
 Sammy Smith, stock car racing driver
 Mackenzie Ziegler, singer, dancer, and actress
 June 8 – Francesca Capaldi, actress
 June 15 – Sterling Jerins, actress
 June 23 – Ashley Sessa, indoor and field hockey player
 June 25 – Madison Reyes, actress and singer
 June 26 – Mikey Williams, basketball player
 June 30 – Claire Curzan, swimmer

July 
 July 1 – Jackson Hopkins, soccer player
 July 2 – Caitlin Carmichael, actress
 July 14 – Brighton Zeuner, skateboarder
 July 28 – Lauren Lindsey Donzis, actress

August 

 August 1 – Neveah Gallegos, murder victim (d. 2007)
 August 2 – Marlowe Peyton, actress
 August 5 – Albert Tsai, actor
 August 14 – Marsai Martin, actress
 August 15 – Thomas Williams, soccer player
 August 19 – Siena Agudong, actress
 August 20 – Alexa Pano, golfer
 August 28 – Lilly Lippeatt, gymnast
 August 30 – Juan Alvarez, soccer player

September 
 September 2 – Reece Gold, racing driver
 September 5 – Robin Montgomery, tennis player
 September 7 – Cullen Wilkerson, soccer player
 September 10 
 Gabriel Bateman, actor
 Oona Brown, ice dancer
 September 23 – Anthony Gonzalez, actor
 September 28 – Mikaila Ulmer, entrepreneur

October 

 October 3 – Noah Schnapp, actor
 October 5 – Reese Brantmeier, tennis player
 October 6 – Bronny James, basketball player and son of LeBron James
 October 9 – Katarina Wolfkostin, ice dancer
 October 12 – Darci Lynne, ventriloquist, singer, and actress
 October 15 – Marilena Kitromilis, figure skater
 October 17 – Javier Mariona, soccer player
 October 18 – Erik Dueñas, soccer player
 October 26 – Pearse O'Brien, soccer player
 October 30 – Elisha Henig, actor

November 
 November 1 – Jayden Bartels, social media personality
 November 9 – Ian Mai, soccer player
 November 10 – Bryce Wettstein, skateboarder
 November 11 – Oakes Fegley, actor
 November 19 – Darren Yapi, soccer player
 November 27 – Jet Jurgensmeyer, actor

December 

 December 2 – Ilia Malinin, figure skater
 December 5 – Jules LeBlanc, internet personality and actress
 December 13
 Aiden Flowers, actor
 Matt Ox, rapper
 December 18 – Isabella Crovetti, child actress (Shimmer and Shine, Vampirina)
 December 19 – Brendan Lambe, soccer player
 December 20 – Rafael Jauregui, soccer player
 December 22
 Bryce Gheisar, actor
 Caleb Wiley, soccer player
 December 24 – Cherish Perrywinkle, murder victim (d. 2013) 
 December 28 – Miles Brown, actor, dancer and rapper

Deaths

January 

 January 1 – Elma Lewis, arts educator (b. 1921)
 January 2 – Lynn Cartwright, actress (b. 1927)
 January 3 – David Lipschultz, journalist (b. 1970)
 January 5 – Tug McGraw, baseball player (b. 1944)
 January 6 – Francesco Scavullo, photographer (b. 1921)
 January 8 – John A. Gambling, radio host (b. 1930)
 January 11 – Spalding Gray, actor and screenwriter (b. 1941)
 January 12 – Randy VanWarmer, singer-songwriter (b. 1955)
 January 13 
 Phillip Crosby, American singer (b. 1934)
 Mike Goliat, American baseball player (b. 1921)
 January 14 
 Uta Hagen, American actress (b. 1919)
 Ron O'Neal, American actor, director, and screenwriter (b. 1937)
 January 17 – Carlton Sickles, American lawyer and politician (b. 1921)
 January 19 – Harry E. Claiborne, lawyer and judge (b. 1917)
 January 22 – Ann Miller, American dancer and actress (b. 1923)
 January 23 – Bob Keeshan, actor, clown and television producer (b. 1927)
 January 27 – Jack Paar, comedian and television host (b. 1918)
 January 28 – Joe Viterelli, American actor (b. 1937)
 January 29 – Ed Sciaky, Philadelphia broadcaster and disk jockey. (b. 1948)
 January 30 – Scott Walker, professional boxer (b. 1969)

February 
 February 3
 Jason Raize, actor and activist (b. 1975)
 Cornelius Bumpus, jazz musician (b. 1945)
 February 4 – Johnny Leartice Robinson, murderer (b. 1952)
 February 5 – Thomas Hinman Moorer, navy admiral (b. 1912)
 February 10 – Paul Ilyinsky, politician (b. 1928)
 February 11 – Tony Pope, voice actor (b. 1947)
 February 13 – Ted Tappe, baseball player (b. 1931)
 February 15 – Jan Miner, actress (b. 1917)
 February 16 – Doris Troy, singer (b. 1937)
 February 22 – Andy Seminick, baseball player, coach and manager (b. 1920)
 February 24
 Ernest Burke, baseball player (b. 1924)
 John Randolph, actor (b. 1915)
 February 27 – Paul Sweezy, American economist and editor (b. 1910)
 February 28 – Daniel J. Boorstin, historian and Librarian of Congress (b. 1914)

March 

 March 2 – Mercedes McCambridge, American actress (b. 1916)
 March 3 – Cecily Adams, American actress (b. 1958)
 March 6 – Frances Dee, American actress (b. 1909)
 March 7 – Paul Winfield, American actor (b. 1939)
 March 8
 Tichi Wilkerson Kassel, American film personality and publisher (b. 1926)
 Robert Pastorelli, American actor (b. 1954)
 March 11 – Philip Arthur Fisher, American stock investor (b. 1907)
 March 16 – Brian Bianchini, American model (b. 1978)
 March 18 – Gene Bearden, American baseball player (b. 1920)
 March 21 – Robert Snyder, American documentary filmmaker (b. 1916)
 March 25 – Jan Berry, American musician (b. 1941)
 March 26 
 J. Edward Roush, American politician (b. 1920)
 Jan Sterling, American actress (b. 1921)
 March 27 – Adán Sánchez, American singer (b. 1984)
 March 30 - Alistair Cooke, British-born American journalist (b. 1908)

April 

 April 1
 Aaron Bank, colonel, founded the US Army Special Forces (b. 1902)
 Carrie Snodgress, American actress (b. 1945)
 April 2 – Harold A. Fidler, American Associate Director of the Lawrence Radiation Laboratory (b. 1910)
 April 4 – George Bamberger, American baseball player and manager (b. 1923)
 April 9 – Harry Babbitt, American singer (b. 1913)
 April 11 – Hy Gotkin, American basketball player (b. 1922)
 April 16 – Wilmot N. Hess, American physicist (b. 1926)
 April 19 – Jim Cantalupo, American businessman (b. 1943)
 April 20 – Al Stiller, American cyclist (b. 1923)
 April 22
 Jason Dunham, American marine (b. 1981)
 Pat Tillman, American football player and soldier killed in action, died in Sperah, Afghanistan (b. 1976)
 April 24 – Estée Lauder, businesswoman (b. 1906)
 April 26 – Hubert Selby, Jr., American writer (b. 1928)

May 

 May 1 – Nelson Gidding, American screenwriter (b. 1919)
 May 2 – Moe Burtschy, American baseball player (b. 1922)
 May 6 – Barney Kessel, American jazz guitarist (b. 1923)
 May 7 – Nicholas Berg, American businessman (b. 1978)
 May 9 – Alan King, American comedian and actor (b. 1927)
 May 12 – Alexander Skutch, American naturalist and writer (b. 1904)
 May 14 – Charlotte Benkner, American supercentenarian (b. 1889)
 May 15 – William H. Hinton, American farmer and writer (b. 1919)
 May 16 – Billy Stone, American football player (b. 1925)
 May 17 – Tony Randall, American actor, comedian, producer, and director (b. 1920)
 May 18 – Elvin Jones, American jazz drummer (b. 1927)
 May 19 – Jack Eckerd, American businessman (b. 1913)
 May 21 – Gene Wood, American television personality (b. 1925)
 May 22 – Richard Biggs, American actor (b. 1960)
 May 23 – Trudy Marshall, American actress (b. 1920)
 May 28 – Irene Manning, American actress and singer (b. 1912)
 May 29 – Archibald Cox, 31st United States Solicitor General from 1961 till 1965. (b. 1912)

June 

 June 1 – William Manchester, American historian (b. 1922)
 June 3 – Morris Schappes, American educator, writer, political activist, historian, and magazine editor (b. 1907)
 June 4 – Steve Lacy, American jazz soprano saxophonist (b. 1934)
 June 5 – Ronald Reagan, American politician and actor, 40th President of the United States (b. 1911)
 June 6 – Riley Fox, murder victim (b. 2001)
 June 7 – Joseph L. Doob, American mathematician (b. 1910)
 June 9 – Rosey Brown, American football player (b. 1932)
 June 10 – Ray Charles, American singer and musician (b. 1930)
 June 13
 Dorothy Lavinia Brown, American surgeon, legislator, and teacher (b. 1914)
 Danny Dark, American voice announcer (b. 1938)
 Dick Durrance, American alpine ski racer (b. 1914)
 June 16 – Herman Goldstine, American mathematician and computer scientist (b. 1913)
 June 22
 Bob Bemer, American computer scientist (b. 1920)
 Thomas Gold, American astrophysicist (b. 1920)
 Mattie Stepanek, American poet (b. 1990)
 June 27 – George Patton IV, U.S. Army General (b. 1923)
 June 30 – Chris Alcaide, American actor (b. 1922)

July 

 July 1 – Marlon Brando, American actor (b. 1924)
 July 5 – Rodger Ward, American race car driver (b. 1921)
 July 6 – Eric Douglas, American actor (b. 1958)
 July 8 – Albert Francis Capone, son of Al Capone (b. 1918)
 July 9 – Isabel Sanford, American actress (b. 1917)
 July 16 – Charles Sweeney, American WWII pilot (b. 1919)
 July 21
 Jerry Goldsmith, American composer (b. 1929)
 Edward B. Lewis, American Nobel geneticist (b. 1918)
 July 28 – Eugene Roche, American actor (b. 1928)
 July 31 – Virginia Grey, American actress (b. 1917)

August 

August 1
 Philip Abelson, American Nobel physicist (b. 1913)
 Alex Scott, notable victim and philanthropist (b. 1996)
 August 6 – Rick James, American musician (b. 1948)
 August 8 – Fay Wray, Canadian-American actress (b. 1907)
 August 13 – Julia Child, chef, author and television host (b. 1912)
 August 18 – Elmer Bernstein, American composer (b. 1922)
 August 26 – Laura Branigan, American singer (b. 1952)
 August 30 – Fred Lawrence Whipple, American astronomer (b. 1906)

September 

 September 2
 Bob O. Evans, IBM computer scientist. (b. 1927)
 Vonda Phelps, American child actress (b. 1915)
 September 5 – Steve Wayne, American actor (b. 1920)
 September 15 – Johnny Ramone, American guitarist (b. 1948)
 September 18 – Russ Meyer, American director and photographer (b. 1922)
 September 19 – Skeeter Davis, American country music singer-songwriter (b. 1931)
 September 22 – Ray Traylor Jr., American professional wrestler (b. 1963)

October 

 October 1 – Richard Avedon, American photographer (b. 1923)
 October 3 – Janet Leigh, American actress (b. 1927)
 October 4 – Gordon Cooper, aeronautical engineer, test pilot and astronaut (b. 1927)
 October 5 – Rodney Dangerfield, American comedian and actor (b. 1921)
 October 10 – Christopher Reeve, American actor, film director, producer, screenwriter, writer and activist (b. 1952)
 October 16 – Pierre Salinger, American politician, and television journalist, died in Cavaillon, France (b. 1925)
 October 17 – Julius Harris, American actor (b. 1923)
 October 26 – Helen Elsie Austin, American attorney (b. 1908)

November 
 November 1 – Mac Dre, rapper (b. 1970)
 November 7 – Howard Keel, actor and singer (b. 1919)
 November 9 – Iris Chang, journalist (b. 1968)
 November 13 
 Thomas M. Foglietta, lawyer and politician, United States Ambassador to Italy (b. 1928)
 Ol' Dirty Bastard, rapper (b. 1968)
 November 18 – Robert Bacher, physicist (b. 1905) 
 November 19 – Jesse Koochin, notable euthanasia victim (b. 1998)
 November 20 – Ancel Keys, nutritionist (b. 1904)
 November 29 – John Drew Barrymore, actor (b. 1932)

December 

 December 4 – Ron Williamson, American baseball player wrongly convicted of rape and murder (b. 1953)
 December 8 – Darrell Lance Abbott, American musician, songwriter and murder victim (b. 1966)
 December 18 – Srully Blotnick, American author and journalist (b. 1941)
 December 19 – Herbert C. Brown, English-born Nobel chemist (b. 1912)
 December 26 – Reggie White, American football player (b. 1961) 
 December 28
 Jerry Orbach, American actor and singer (b. 1935)
 Susan Sontag, American writer and activist (b. 1933)
 December 29 – Julius Axelrod, American biochemist and academic, Nobel Prize laureate (b. 1912)
 December 30 – Artie Shaw, American musician (b. 1910)

See also 
 2004 in American soccer
 2004 in American television
 List of American films of 2004

References

External links
 

 
2000s in the United States
United States
United States
Years of the 21st century in the United States